Albert Brown (born December 19, 1963) is a former Canadian football defensive back in the Canadian Football League (CFL). He played for the Saskatchewan Roughriders and Winnipeg Blue Bombers. Brown played college football at Western Illinois.

References

1963 births
Living people
Sportspeople from Omaha, Nebraska
Players of American football from Nebraska
American players of Canadian football
American football defensive backs
Canadian football defensive backs
Western Illinois Leathernecks football players
Saskatchewan Roughriders players
Winnipeg Blue Bombers players